Jeremiah Mordi (born 7 January 1993) is a Nigerian professional basketball player who currently plays for the London Lightning of theNBL Canada (NBLC). Born in Lagos, he played college basketball for Queens College. After four seasons with Queens, he turned professional and started his career in Canada.

Early and personal life
He was born in Lagos. 

Jeremiah Mordi recalls that basketball has been a part of him since he was a kid. 

He went to Queens College, City University of New York.

Professional career
During the 2019-20 season, he played for Moncton Magic where he was elected to the All NBL First team. He recorded 16 points, 7.1 rebounds and 5.9 assists on average (23.4 efficiency). He had a 60.3% three-point quota.

In July 2020 he joined Caen Basket Calvados under head coach Fabrice Courcier.

Texas Legends (2021)
On November 15, 2021, Mordi was waived by the Texas Legends.

Kwara Falcons (2023) 
In February 2023, Mordi joined the Nigerian club Kwara Falcons of the Basketball Africa League (BAL).

National team career
Mordi played for the Nigerian national team at the FIBA AfroBasket 2021 in Rwanda.

Player profile
Jeremiah Mordi can play both guard positions. He is especially known for his three-point shooting. Fabrice Courcier, Mordi's coach at Caen further stated that he hired Mordi because "..he an altruistic player capable of scoring, of making others play and of taking rebounds. He is tall (1.93 m), athletic, versatile. I had very good feedback on his ethos."

References

External links
Jeremiah Mordi at FIBA AfroBasket 2021
Jeremiah Mordi at USbasket.com
Jeremiah Mordi at Proballers.com
Jeremiah Mordi at RealGM.com
Jeremiah Mordi at Scoutbasketball.com

1993 births
Living people
Nigerian expatriate basketball people in Canada
Nigerian expatriate basketball people in France
Nigerian expatriate basketball people in the United States
Nigerian men's basketball players
Point guards
Queens Knights men's basketball players
Sportspeople from Lagos
Texas Legends players
Kwara Falcons players